Goransko Polje (Cyrillic: Горанско Поље) is a village in the municipality of Konjic, Bosnia and Herzegovina.

Demographics 
According to the 2013 census, Goransko Polje's population was 56.

References

Populated places in Konjic